Euphlyctinides albifusum is a species of moth of the family Limacodidae. It is found in India and Nepal.

References 

Limacodidae
Moths described in 1892
Moths of Asia